Pautalia Glacier is a small glacier on Burgas Peninsula, Livingston Island in the South Shetland Islands, Antarctica situated northeast of Strandzha Glacier and south of Sopot Ice Piedmont. It is bounded by Petko Voyvoda Peak to the west, Sozopol Gap to the northwest, Kaloyan Nunatak to the north and Shabla Knoll to the east.  The glacier extends 700 m in northwest-southeast direction and 1.1 km in southwest-northeast direction, and flows southeastward into Bransfield Strait.

The feature is named after the ancient Pautalia, ancestor of the present town of Kyustendil in Western Bulgaria.

Location
Bulgarian mapping in 2005 and 2009.

See also
 List of glaciers in the Antarctic
 Glaciology

Maps
 L.L. Ivanov et al. Antarctica: Livingston Island and Greenwich Island, South Shetland Islands. Scale 1:100000 topographic map. Sofia: Antarctic Place-names Commission of Bulgaria, 2005.
 L.L. Ivanov. Antarctica: Livingston Island and Greenwich, Robert, Snow and Smith Islands. Scale 1:120000 topographic map.  Troyan: Manfred Wörner Foundation, 2009.

References
 Pautalia Glacier. SCAR Composite Gazetteer of Antarctica
 Bulgarian Antarctic Gazetteer. Antarctic Place-names Commission. (details in Bulgarian, basic data in English)

External links
 Pautalia Glacier. Copernix satellite image

Glaciers of Livingston Island